"I Kissed a Girl" is the debut single of American singer Katy Perry from her second studio album, One of the Boys (2008). It was released on April 28, 2008, by Capitol Records as the lead single from the record. Perry co-wrote the song with Max Martin, Cathy Dennis, and its producer Dr. Luke, with additional production from Benny Blanco. "I Kissed a Girl" is a pop-rock, electropop, and disco song with elements of new wave. Perry stated its lyrics are "about the magical beauty of a woman." The song sparked controversy for its handling of bi-curious themes, but in retrospect has been viewed as the beginning of LGBT awareness in pop music.

The song topped the US Billboard Hot 100 chart for seven consecutive weeks, becoming the 1,000th number-one song of the rock era. The single has sold 4.8 million units in the US alone. "I Kissed a Girl" is one of eight songs by Perry to sell over 4 million digital copies in the US, the others being "Hot n Cold", "California Gurls", "Teenage Dream", "Firework", "E.T.", "Dark Horse" and "Roar". It also topped the charts in Australia, Austria, Belgium, Canada, the Czech Republic, Denmark, Germany, Hungary, Ireland, Italy, New Zealand, Norway, Scotland, Sweden, Switzerland, and the United Kingdom. It was the best-selling song of 2008 in Finland. The song has been certified multi-platinum in Australia, Canada, Denmark, the UK, and the US.

An accompanying music video for the song was released on May 16, 2008. The video, directed by Kinga Burza, features the singer in a setting inspired by burlesque and Moulin Rouge styles. It features appearances from Perry's friends, including actress Shannon Woodward and singer Kesha. The song is recognized as the 10th best-selling single in the 21st century. "I Kissed a Girl" was performed and a nominee at the 51st Grammy Awards (Grammy Award for Best Female Pop Vocal Performance). It was also nominated for Favorite Song at the 2009 Kids' Choice Awards. The song has been performed on all of her tours. It was also included in Perry's performance in Super Bowl XLIX's Pepsi Halftime Show in 2015.

Background
According to Perry, "the chorus actually popped into my head when I woke up". Perry also said that it somewhat was from personal experience. "It was one of those moments where you hear artists talking about songs they get in dreams or in the middle of the night. I was like 'wow, what an interesting subject matter to kind of pop into the head' and I didn't do anything with it for about a year-and-a-half. Then all of a sudden at the very, very end of making my album, I literally had two days left in the recording studio with my producer, Dr Luke. We just said, 'we're gonna finish it—it's so catchy because it won't get out of our heads.'"

Capitol A&R Chris Anokute told HitQuarters that the song and its controversial theme met with strong resistance at the label. "People said, 'This is never going to get played on the radio. How do we sell this? How's this going to be played in the Bible Belt?'" Anokute said that they needed the support of one of the label's radio promoters to convince people to believe in the record. Otherwise, Perry would have likely been dropped again. Dennis Reese, Capitol's senior vice president of promotions, saw the vision and helped push the single on national radio. The first station to pick it up and take a chance was 107.5 The River in Nashville. Rich Davis, then PD, was played the song by Joe Rainey of Capitol Records outside his favorite sushi spot in Nashville and immediately put it on the air. After playing it for three days, they were inundated with enthusiastic calls.

Composition

"I Kissed a Girl" has a length of three minutes. The song is a pop rock, new wave, electropop, and disco track which runs through a throbbing beat  and an organic instrumental thump, according to About.com's Bill Lamb. It features instrumentation provided by drums, guitars, and bass, courtesy of Dr. Luke. The song was produced by Dr. Luke, which was coordinated by Gary 'G' Silver and aided by American producer and songwriter Benny Blanco. There were a number of personnel who engineered the track for the album, including Emily Wright, Sam Holland, Nick Banns, Aniela Gottwald, Mike Caffrey, and Tina Kennedy. Kitty Purty assisted in the engineering while Tim Roberts assisted in the engineering for mix, which was done by John Hanes. The song was mixed by Serban Ghenea at his studio MixStar Studios in Virginia Beach, Virginia. Cathy Dennis was on background vocals while Dr. Luke and Benny Blanco were featured on drums and programming. Steven Wolf provided the live drums on the song while Mike Caffrey recorded and produced the drums at Monster Island in New York City.

In an interview for The New Gay, Perry describes the song to be about girls. She defends the lyrics, saying that "When we're young, we're very touchy-feely. We have slumber party sing-a-longs, we make up dance routines in our pajamas. We're a lot more intimate in a friendship than guys can be. It's not perverse but just sweet..." The song was partially inspired by Scarlett Johansson. Perry also stated that the lyrics were inspired by her friendship with a girl as a teenager, commenting that "I did kiss her. I was totally obsessed with her. She was beautiful — porcelain skin, perfect lips." While Perry has not explicitly revealed the main person behind the inspiration of the song, Miley Cyrus has claimed it was about her.

In an interview with the German online web show MalcolmMusic, Macy Gray revealed that "I Kissed a Girl" was initially offered to her before Perry ended up releasing the song.

The song is written in the key of A minor in common time with a tempo of 130 beats per minute. It follows a chord progression of Am-[Bdim-C]-Dm7-[F5-Em] in the verses, Am-C-Dm-[F-Em] in the choruses (except for the Dm chord being major in the third segment), and F-Em-Am-G in the bridge, which ends with an extra-Dm chord. Perry's vocals span from A3 to E5.

Critical reception
Blogcritics magazine called it "an instantly catchy number." About.com said, "fueled by an instrumental wallop provided courtesy of producer Dr. Luke, 'I Kissed a Girl' is the perfect breakthrough." However, Rolling Stone magazine, while giving her album 2/5 stars, described the song as a "new wave-y club single", saying the supposedly rebellious "attention-grabbing" lyrics are "a vanilla recounting of her chick-on-chick exploits" and that this "acting out" is "just to get a dude's attention." AllMusic praises "the stomping Gary Glitter beat" before criticizing the producers for turning it "into a leaden stumble and burying Perry's voice underneath Pro Tools overdubs so it all winds up as a faceless wash of sound designed to be placed in TV shows, movie trailers, and malls."

Sal Cinquemani of Slant Magazine wrote that Perry's "lead single 'I Kissed a Girl' features a throbbing beat and an infectious, bi-curious hook, but its self-satisfied, in-your-face posturing rings phony in comparison to the expertly constructed ambiguities of 'Justify My Love' or practically anything in the first decade of Ani DiFranco's catalog; it's like a tween version of DiFranco's tortured bisexual confession 'Light of Some Kind'." Hiponline.com wrote that the song is "not nearly as interesting or exciting as you'd expect. It's not even half as good as Jill Sobule's song 'I Kissed a Girl'." Glitterati Gossip agreed Sobule's song "was ten times better, because there was actual emotional content to her lyrics."

Sobule herself facetiously attacked Perry in an interview with The Rumpus in 2009:

Days later, Sobule explained in a Huffington Post article she penned, stating,

Controversy

The song received criticism from some members of the LGBT community, although it also had its staunch supporters. AllMusic concluded, "the problem is not with Katy's gender-bending, it's that her heart isn't in it; she's just using it to get her places, so she sinks to crass, craven depths." Slant Magazine agreed, saying the song "isn't problematic because it promotes homosexuality, but because its appropriation of the gay lifestyle exists for the sole purpose of garnering attention — both from Perry's boyfriend and her audience."

Adam Holz of PluggedinOnline, a division of Focus on the Family, wrote an article entitled "A Tale of Two Katys" about the singer's image transformation from a Contemporary Christian music artist to one of the "girls gone wild." He criticizes the song for being the latest, "high-profile message to young women and men that our sexuality is a malleable commodity that can be reshaped at will." Holz also argues that Perry's message carries with it "no need to worry about who might get used or objectified in the process," causing Perry to live "down to a damaging, demeaning stereotype." After numerous reports that Perry's religious parents were against her music and career, she stated in August 2008, "They love and support me."

Though the Toronto Star describes it as "a lesbian-friendly tune," whether homophobia fuels negative reactions to the song or the song itself appears to divide critics. Slant and other critics suggest that Perry may be homophobic, especially given her single "Ur So Gay", which makes "I Kissed a Girl" seems like "a classic example of the 'Guys kissing is gross, girls kissing is hot' line of thought," which promotes hypersexualization of queer women and demonization of queer men.

On the other hand, according to The Advocate, Perry claims she has heard countless stories of people opening their eyes to their own sexual desires because of the song. Since the release of the song, she has been considered a strong and steadfast supporter of LGBT rights. Out described Katy Perry as a gay icon. Perry dedicated the music video for "Firework" to the It Gets Better Project. Perry was additionally awarded the National Equality Award by the Human Rights Campaign.

MomLogic.com writer Vuv-A-Licious asked, "What's the big deal? ... When this tune is playing and my son and daughter are dancing, I will be trying to dance along, or trying to acknowledge that they may one day dance to the beat of a different drummer than me."

When asked about her own sexuality, Perry told Santa Barbara magazine: "I like to kiss boys, but there is no doubt in my mind if Angelina Jolie or Gisele Bündchen came a callin', who wouldn't pucker up?" Perry told The New Gay she had never actually kissed a girl and is heterosexual. She is quoted as saying "Yeah, it's fantasy, it's a song about curiosity."

At an annual fundraiser in 2008, she recalled: "I remember having a little crush when I was 15 on this girl who was a little bit older than me. She was my best friend at the time [but] I never kissed her or anything. In retrospect, she was my muse for that song." When asked by OK! magazine about kissing a girl, she replied: "Of course. I think I was 19. I kissed a girl and it was great", she also added: "Growing up I had a friend who, looking back, I think I had an obsessive little crush on her. I never kissed her but she was very beautiful and she was like a ballerina and I wanted to copy everything she did. But I think that was kind of the extent of it."

In a separate interview in 2010, Perry stated to a female interviewer that she has kissed several girls. Perry later admitted to Vanity Fair in early May 2011 that the reason she did not discuss it honestly at first was that a couple of "sleazy" male journalists made her uncomfortable, she stated: "So I said no, I hadn't experienced it, even though I had, because I didn't like where the guys were taking the interviews."

In February 2009, Márcio Barros, a substitute English-language teacher in Distrito Federal, Brazil, public school was fired after he used the song in a class activity among students aged 12 to 14. He was accused of promoting "homosexualism" and alcoholic beverages through the lyrics. The Secretary of Education supported the decision of the head of the school.

In a February 2018 online Glamour article, Perry expressed the following about her song:"We've really changed, conversationally, in the past 10 years. We've come a long way. Bisexuality wasn't as talked about back then, or any type of fluidity. If I had to write that song again, I probably would make an edit on it. Lyrically, it has a couple of stereotypes in it. Your mind changes so much in 10 years, and you grow so much. What's true for you can evolve."

Chart performance
"I Kissed a Girl" debuted at No. 76 on the Billboard Hot 100. After a couple of weeks, the single hit the top five, due to the rising digital downloads and increasing radio airplay. It continued to rise the next week, reaching No. 2, just behind her labelmates, Coldplay. On the chart dated July 5, 2008, the song peaked at the summit of the Billboard Hot 100, becoming the 1,000th No. 1 song of the rock era (the 961st No. 1 single on the Billboard Hot 100). In addition, the song also gave the Capitol label two consecutive Hot 100  No. 1  singles following Coldplay's "Viva la Vida", making it the first time since 1976 that Capitol had two back-to-back chart-toppers on the Hot 100. The single also crossed over to Billboards sister publication R&R's Rhythmic chart in its July 5 issue, where not only did she have the highest debut ever for a non-rhythmic track, entering at  No. 26 with 1,065 spins, she also had the highest debut from a new artist in over five years. The bow is the best for a debut track at Rhythmic since Beyoncé entered at no. 21 with "Crazy in Love" in 2003. It also has become the first song since Gnarls Barkley's "Crazy" to simultaneously appear on the Mainstream Top 40, Rhythmic, Adult Top 40, and Alternative charts. On July 26, 2008, the track also made history by reaching the No. 1 spot on Billboard'''s Hot Dance Airplay chart by three weeks, a first for a solo act with a debut single. The song topped the Hot 100 for seven weeks in a row before being dethroned by Rihanna's "Disturbia". It was the second longest-running No. 1 on the Hot 100 of 2008 (tied with T.I.'s "Whatever You Like"), with only Flo Rida's "Low" topping the chart for longer. As of August 2020, the song has been certified sextuple platinum by the Recording Industry Association of America (RIAA) and sold 4.8 million copies in the United States.

In the United Kingdom, the single debuted at  No. 4  on the UK Singles Chart on August 3, 2008, ― for the week ending date August 9, 2008. A week later, it topped the chart, where it remained for five weeks (a feat which would not be matched again until "Someone like You" by Adele in 2011) until it was dethroned by "Sex on Fire" by Kings of Leon. Alongside Basshunter's "Now You're Gone" and "Mercy" by Duffy, "I Kissed a Girl" spent more weeks at No. 1 on the UK Singles Chart than any other single in 2008. According to the Official Charts Company, the single has sold over 635,000 copies in Britain as of June 2010. It is the first Virgin label single to sell more than half a million copies since the Spice Girls' "Goodbye" in 1998. As of March 2012, the single had sold 654,560 copies in the United Kingdom, becoming her fourth-best-selling single there, behind "Firework", "Roar" and "California Gurls".

In Canada, the single debuted at No. 55 on the Canadian Hot 100, later peaking at No. 1, becoming the first country where the song reached the top of the charts.

In New Zealand, the song debuted at No. 38 on the New Zealand Singles Chart, the single's first appearance in other countries chart outside North America, moving to No. 3 the following week. The song was certified Gold after seven weeks with sales of over 7,500. On August 11, 2008, eight weeks after debuting on the chart, "I Kissed a Girl" finally made it to No. 1. "I Kissed a Girl" was certified platinum in New Zealand after 20 weeks, selling more than 15,000 copies.

In Australia, the song debuted at No. 30 on downloads alone. The next week, it jumped to  No. 2, still on downloads alone. It later jumped to  No. 1  still solely off downloads, becoming only the second single to do so. On July 21, 2008, after the single's physical release, the track retained its  No. 1 position and was certified Gold. The single held the No. 1 position for several weeks and was certified double platinum. 

According to Perry, the song became a massive hit for being musically "catchy". She told BBC News: "I think that it's one of those subject matters that is, you know, like 'Oh my God I can't believe she said that, that someone came out and said it.' I think that, whenever anyone writes something that is different than, like, your plain peanut butter and jelly song, 'I love you, you love me,' everyone kind of perks up and says 'what's this?'"

Music video
A music video for the song was released on May 16, 2008, on Perry's personal website and on Myspace. The video was directed by Kinga Burza and features a Moulin Rouge and burlesque-type setting with scenes of Perry, along with many other flamboyantly dressed women dancing to the song. Towards the end of the video, she wakes up next to a male companion, played by DJ Skeet Skeet. Despite the song's title, there is no depiction of same-sex kissing at all. Perry features her real-life friend and DJ, Mia Moretti, Markus Molinari's cat Bella and Kesha in the music video.

 Accolades 
The song was listed at the ASCAP Pop Music Awards as one of 50 Most Performed Songs of 2008. Other honors given to the song include the following:
{| class="wikitable plainrowheaders"
|-
! Year
! Organization
! Award
! Result
! Ref.
|-
! rowspan="10" scope="row" | 2008
| Los Premios MTV Latinoamérica
| Song of the Year
| 
| style="text-align:center;"|
|-
| MTV Europe Music Awards
| Most Addictive Track
| 
| style="text-align:center;"|
|-
| rowspan = "5" | MTV Video Music Awards
| Best Art Direction
| 
| rowspan="5" style="text-align:center;"|
|-
| Best Cinematography
| 
|-
| Best Editing
| 
|-
| Best Female Video
| 
|-
| Best New Artist
| 
|-
| Q Awards
| Best Track
| 
|style="text-align:center;"|
|-
| The Record of the Year
| The Record of the Year
| 
|style="text-align:center;"|
|-
| Teen Choice Awards
| Choice Music: Summer Song
| 
|style="text-align:center;"|
|-
! rowspan="10" scope="row" | 2009
| Grammy Awards
| Best Female Pop Vocal Performance
| 
|style="text-align:center;"|
|-
| rowspan = "2" |MTV Video Music Awards Japan
| Best Pop Video
| 
|style="text-align:center;"|
|-
| Best New Artist
| 
|style="text-align:center;"|
|-
| MuchMusic Video Awards
| UR Fave: International Artist
| 
| style="text-align:center;" | 
|-
| Nickelodeon Kids' Choice Awards
| Favorite Song
| 
| style="text-align:center;" | 
|-
| People's Choice Awards
| Favorite Pop Song
| 
|style="text-align:center;"|

Cover versions
A cover version by Barnicle entered the UK Singles Chart (published August 3, 2008) at position  No. 116. Perry's version was brought forward from a September 1 release to July 30, 2008. On August 3, 2008, the song, which had entered the UK Singles Chart at No. 139 the week before, climbed 135 places to reach position No. 4. In 2008, Cobra Starship recorded a parody titled "I Kissed a Boy." It was included on the 2008 Fall Out Boy mixtape album, Welcome to the New Administration.

Usage in media
The song is featured in the films Fiston, Blended, Boy Meets Girl and Pitch Perfect 2 along with the television shows Glee, Skins, The Hills, 20 to 1, The Big Bang Theory, The Game, and RuPaul's Drag Race All Stars''.

Track listing
 CD single
 "I Kissed a Girl" – 3:00
 "I Kissed a Girl" (Jason Nevins Funkrokr Extended Mix) – 6:51
 "I Kissed a Girl" (Dr. Luke & Benny Blanco Remix) – 3:28

Remixes

 Jason Nevins Mixes
 "I Kissed a Girl" (Jason Nevins Funkrokr Extended Mix) – 6:51
 "I Kissed a Girl" (Jason Nevins Funkrokr Edit) – 3:33
 Dr. Luke & Benny Blanco Mixes
 "I Kissed a Girl" (Dr. Luke & Benny Blanco Mix) – 3:28
 "I Kissed a Girl" (Dr. Luke & Benny Blanco Extended Mix) – 6:06
 "I Kissed a Girl" (Rock Mix) – 2:57
 "I Kissed a Girl" (Rock Mix - Instrumental) – 2:57 
 Norman & Attalla Mixes
 "I Kissed a Girl" (Norman & Attalla Remix) – 8:00
 "I Kissed a Girl" (Norman & Attalla Radio Edit) – 3:43
 Morgan Page Mix
 "I Kissed a Girl" (Morgan Page Remix) – 4:04
 The Knocks Mix
 "I Kissed a Girl" (The Knocks Remix) – 4:37

Charts

Weekly charts

Year-end charts

Decade-end charts

Certifications and sales

}

Release history

See also

 List of Ultratop 50 number-one singles of 2008
 List of Hot 100 number-one singles of 2008 (Canada)
 List of Danish number-one hits
 List of European number-one hits of 2008
 List of number-one hits of 2008 (Germany)
 List of number-one singles of 2008 (Ireland)
 List of number-one hits of 2008 (Italy)
 List of Dutch Top 40 number-one singles of 2008
 List of number-one hits of 2008 (Austria)
 List of number-one singles of 2008 (Australia)
 List of number-one singles (Sweden)
 List of number-one hits of 2008 (Switzerland)
 List of UK Singles Chart number ones of the 2000s
 List of Hot 100 number-one singles of 2008 (U.S.)
 List of number-one songs in Norway
 List of number-one singles from the 2000s (New Zealand)
 List of Billboard Hot 100 top 10 singles in 2008
 List of best-selling singles in the United States
 Grammy Award for Best Female Pop Vocal Performance

References

Footnotes

Cites

Songs about kissing
2008 debut singles
Katy Perry songs
Billboard Hot 100 number-one singles
Number-one singles in Australia
Number-one singles in Austria
Ultratop 50 Singles (Flanders) number-one singles
Canadian Hot 100 number-one singles
Number-one singles in Denmark
European Hot 100 Singles number-one singles
Number-one singles in Germany
Irish Singles Chart number-one singles
Number-one singles in Italy
Dutch Top 40 number-one singles
Number-one singles in New Zealand
Number-one singles in Norway
Number-one singles in Scotland
Number-one singles in Sweden
Number-one singles in Switzerland
Record Report Pop Rock General number-one singles
UK Singles Chart number-one singles
Lesbian-related songs
Songs written by Katy Perry
Songs written by Max Martin
Songs written by Cathy Dennis
Songs written by Dr. Luke
Song recordings produced by Dr. Luke
Capitol Records singles
LGBT-related controversies in music
Obscenity controversies in music
2008 songs